Michael Moore Is a Big Fat Stupid White Man is a book by David T. Hardy and Jason Clarke about author and filmmaker Michael Moore, criticizing him and his works. The title can be seen as a parody of the titles Stupid White Men by Moore and Rush Limbaugh is a Big Fat Idiot by Al Franken. It was listed as a best-seller by The New York Times in August 2004.

References

2004 non-fiction books
Satirical books
Comedy books
Political books
Works about Michael Moore
HarperCollins books
Collaborative non-fiction books